Dreamthinkspeak is a British theatre company based in Brighton, that formed in 1999. It creates and produces the work of its artistic director Tristan Sharps. Dreamthinkspeak produces immersive, site-responsive / promenade theatre.

Productions
Who Goes There?, Battersea Arts Centre, London, 2002
Don't Look Back, South Hill Park, Bracknell, 2003
One Step Forward, One Step Back, Liverpool Cathedral, 2008
Before I Sleep, old Co-op building, Brighton, 2010
Underground, Theatre Royal, Brighton, 2011
The Rest Is Silence, Brighton Festival, Brighton and Hove, 2012; Riverside Studios, London, 2012
In The Beginning Was The End, Somerset House, London, 2013
Absent, Shoreditch Town Hall, London, 2015
One Day, Maybe, King William House, Hull, 2017
Unchain Me, Brighton Festival, Brighton and Hove, 2022

References

External links

Site-specific theatre
Contemporary art organizations
Theatre companies in the United Kingdom
English artist groups and collectives
1999 establishments in England